Diaz Lake, elevation , is located in the Owens Valley, just south of Lone Pine, California, United States.

History
The lake was formed by the 1872 Lone Pine earthquake on Tuesday, March 26 of that year when  of the Owens Valley dropped approximately 20 feet (6 m) (see graben) and a new spring opened, causing water to fill the lowland.

The lake was named for the Diaz family who established a ranch here when brothers Rafael and Eleuterio Diaz emigrated from Chile in the 1860s. They owned and operated a successful cattle ranch until the land was sold to the city of Los Angeles.

Access
Year-round fishing is available, and the "Diaz Lake Fish Derby" is held the first Saturday in March.

See also
 List of lakes in California

References

Lakes of the Mojave Desert
Lakes of Inyo County, California
Lakes of California
Lakes of Southern California